Never Too Late is a 1925 American silent comedy action film directed by Forrest Sheldon and starring Francis X. Bushman Jr., Gino Corrado and Ollie Kirby.

Plot summary

Cast
 Francis X. Bushman Jr. as Johnny Adams
 Harriet Loweree as Helen Bentley
 Gino Corrado as Count Gaston La Rue
 Ollie Kirby as Mabel Greystone
 Charles Belcher as Arthur Greystone
 Roy Laidlaw as Robert Leland
 Lorimer Johnston as John Kemp

References

Bibliography
 Connelly, Robert B. The Silents: Silent Feature Films, 1910-36, Volume 40, Issue 2. December Press, 1998.
 Munden, Kenneth White. The American Film Institute Catalog of Motion Pictures Produced in the United States, Part 1. University of California Press, 1997.

External links
 
 
 

1925 films
1920s action films
1920s English-language films
American silent feature films
American action comedy films
American black-and-white films
Films directed by Forrest Sheldon
1920s American films
Silent American comedy films